The News Media Bargaining Code (or News Media and Digital Platforms Mandatory Bargaining Code) is a law designed to have large technology platforms that operate in Australia pay local news publishers for the news content made available or linked on their platforms. The law's definition of news is broad, including "content that reports, investigates or explains ... current issues or events of public significance for Australians at a local, regional or national level." Originating in April 2020, when the Australian Government asked the Australian Competition and Consumer Commission (ACCC) to begin drafting it, it achieved broad support in the Australian Parliament but staunch opposition from Facebook and Google. In response, on 18 February 2021, Facebook blocked Australian users from sharing or viewing news content on its platform. The Australian government strongly criticised the move, saying it demonstrated the "immense market power of these digital social giants". A few days later, Australia and Facebook came to an agreement on restoring news pages.

Purpose 
The bill seeks to "address a bargaining power imbalance that exists between digital platforms and Australian news businesses" which the ACCC identified in its Digital Platforms Inquiry report.
The Australian government hopes it "will ensure that news media businesses are fairly remunerated for the content they generate, helping to sustain public interest journalism in Australia".

It would require stakeholders to agree to a dollar value of the news content distributed by the platforms, pay that revenue to registered news publishers, and agree to final offer arbitration in the case of a dispute between a publisher and a platform on the value of the news content. The bill defined making "content available" by "if the content is reproduced on the service, or is otherwise placed on the service, or if a link to the content or an extract of the content is provided on the service." Nine Network estimated this amount to be $432 million. The code would also require digital platforms give 28 days notice to Australian news publishers about algorithm changes that could affect links to their news content.

Proponents of the law argue that the profitability of social media companies is partly attributable to the fact that users can receive news updates even when they do not view the ads on the page of the original publisher.

Reception 
The code was supported by media companies based outside Australia The Guardian, the Daily Mail, and News Corp. The bill was also supported by the Australian Press Council. The bill also saw support from public broadcasters, the Australian Broadcasting Corporation and the Special Broadcasting Service, following their amended inclusion in the remuneration stages of the code. The bill also saw support from Microsoft, which issued a statement suggesting that the code would be made to work with its search engine Bing. This followed a comment from Google Australia which said the company would pull out of the Australian market if the code was enacted. 

Smaller journalistic entities including The New Daily, Crikey and the Country Press Association have argued that the code favors dominant media companies at the expense of smaller publishers.

Google criticized the idea as unfeasible, especially the restrictions on when they can change the algorithms for how various sources are ranked. The policy director of the Australian Taxpayers' Alliance called the measure protectionism. Other notable technologists including World Wide Web inventor Tim Berners-Lee, journalism professor Jeff Jarvis, New York Times technology journalist Kara Swisher and Stratechery writer Ben Thompson have criticized the code for being technically unworkable. Former Australian Prime Minister Kevin Rudd, who is a prominent activist against News Corp, argued that the code was designed to favour the company's properties. Crikey political editor Bernard Keane criticised Australian mainstream media for allegedly "systematically misleading [their] audiences" over the code and the legislation.

History 
In December 2017, the Turnbull Government directed the ACCC to conduct an inquiry into "competition in media and advertising services markets", focusing in large part on Google and Facebook. The final report published in July 2019 made several conclusions regarding the state of competition in the news and media landscape:

In April 2020, the Morrison Government directed the ACCC to develop a mandatory code “to address bargaining power imbalances between digital platforms and media companies”. The draft News Media Bargaining Code was published by the ACCC in July 2020, and interested parties were invited to make submissions regarding the proposed code.

In August 2020, Google users in Australia were directed to an open letter protesting the law, which the ACCC characterized as misleading. The letter stated that Google already complies with existing reimbursement programs that are less broad. While in submission phase in Parliament, Google Australia director Mel Silva said the bill was "untenable" and that the company would discontinue access to its search engine within Australia if the code was enacted without changes.

On 28 August 2020, the ACCC closed the consultation period on the proposal. The code was converted to a bill and sent to Parliament in December 2020.

The bill caused digital platforms to negotiate payments to local news publishers. By February 2021, Google established deals in anticipation of the code's enactment and negotiated lump sum deals with Seven West Media, Nine Entertainment Co, and News Corp to provide content for the company's new "News Showcase" feature. These deals would mean Google can avoid entering the arbitration stages of the code.

Facebook blocks news
In August 2020 Facebook stated that the proposed legislation left them "with a choice of either removing news entirely or accepting a system that lets publishers charge us for as much content as they want at a price with no clear limits". Facebook warned that if the "draft code becomes law, we will reluctantly stop allowing publishers and people in Australia from sharing local and international news on Facebook and Instagram". Following the Senate committee endorsing the legislation without pushing for any amendments, on 17 February 2021 Facebook claimed "the proposed law fundamentally misunderstands the relationship between our platform and publishers who use it to share news content" and blocked all Australian news from being shared by anyone on their platform and blocked all news from being seen or shared by users in Australia. Facebook also blocked pages of some government, community, union, charity, political, and emergency services, which were later reinstated. The company said this was a result of the bill having a broad definition of news content. For example, as the main provider of weather forecasts, warnings and observations to the Australian public, the Bureau of Meteorology by definition "reports, investigates or explains ... current issues or events of public significance for Australians at a local, regional or national level", and was one of the services initially affected.

In a Facebook post, Australian Prime Minister Scott Morrison said that "Facebook's actions to unfriend Australia, cutting off essential information services on health and emergency services, were as arrogant as they were disappointing." The move by the company saw widespread condemnation by Australian political leaders, and a mixed reaction from Australian residents and experts. The Australian government strongly criticised the move, saying it demonstrated the "immense market power of these digital social giants". The federal government announced it is stopping all its advertising campaigns on Facebook, worth millions of dollars. Days after Facebook's response to the bill and experts predicting that misinformation on Facebook will spread more rapidly, with a spokesperson for one of the country's biggest media companies saying “Facebook will now be a platform for misinformation to rapidly spread without balance”. In late February, technology companies including Facebook and Google released the final version of an industry code to address the spread of misinformation on their services in Australia.

On 22 February Facebook said it reached an agreement with the Australian government that would see news returning to Australian users in the coming days.

See also 
 Copyright aspects of hyperlinking and framing
 Disruptive innovation
 History of fair use proposals in Australia
 Internet neutrality
 Mass media in Australia

References

Further reading 
 
 

Australian copyright law
Digital rights
Fair use
Freedom of information
Protectionism